106 Sul Cine Brasília is a Federal District Metro brazilian station on Orange and Green lines. It was opened on 16 September 2020 and added to the already operating section of the line, from Central to Terminal Samambaia and Terminal Ceilândia. It is located between 102 Sul and 108 Sul near the Cine Brasília, where took place the annual Brasília Film Festival.

References

Brasília Metro stations
2020 establishments in Brazil
Railway stations opened in 2020